Fatal Attraction is an American true crime television series that airs on TV One. The series debuted on June 3, 2013, and is produced by Jupiter Entertainment. On January 24, 2019, TV One announced it was renewing the series for an eighth season which premiered on January 28, 2019.

On January 10, 2020, it was announced that the ninth season will premiere on January 13, 2020.

The series features non-fiction narratives of crimes committed by a partner in an abusive relationship. The program is edited in a documentary style, using a central voice-over narration by Malikha Mallette, as well as interviews with people who have first-hand knowledge of the case, including law-enforcement officials, lawyers, journalists, friends and family members of both the victims and the accused. The first season was narrated by Lynn Whitfield.

In 2014, a subject in one of the shows claimed he had been unfairly depicted as a killer, and filed suit for defamation against TV One and Jupiter in Maryland District Court, seeking $650,000 in damages.

References

External links

Official Site

2013 American television series debuts
True crime television series
TV One (American TV channel) original programming